John Abercrombie or Abercromby may refer to:

John Abercrombie (guitarist) (1944–2017), American jazz guitarist
John Abercrombie (congressman) (1866–1940), President of the University of Alabama and United States Representative from Alabama
John Abercromby, 5th Baron Abercromby (1841–1924), Scottish antiquary
John Abercrombie (cricketer) (1817–1892), English cricketer
John Joseph Abercrombie (1798–1877), US Army Civil War brigadier general
John Abercrombie (physician) (1780–1844), Scottish physician and philosopher 
John Abercrombie (horticulturalist) (1726–1806), Scottish horticulturalist and writer
John Abercromby (monk) (fl. 1561), 16th-century Roman Catholic martyr, maybe fictitious 
Sir John Abercromby (British Army officer) (1772–1817), British general and politician